Komal Nahta (born 30 April 1964) is an Indian film trade analyst. Nahta is the publisher of "Film Information" and also a television show host. He is an anchor of the trade show ETC Bollywood Business on the Bollywood TV channels ETC and Zee Cinema. He is in the advisory board of Cinema Capital and other top companies. He is the son of film producer Ramraj Nahta.

Career
His interviews are carried by  CNBC, STAR, Zee, B4U, NDTV, Zoom, and Doordarshan. He was also the Bollywood representative of the BBC for almost 10 years. The Asian Development Bank(ADB) has appointed him advisor for its film financing division. In May 2007, Shah Rukh Khan and Karan Johar officially launched his weekly film magazine, The Film Street Journal.

On 26 April 2010, Nahta replaced Taran Adarsh (his real-life cousin) as the host of ETC Bollywood Business on the Indian TV channels ETC (India) and Zee Cinema (UK). His show airs daily on weekdays at 10 pm in India and at 7:30 pm in the UK. On Mondays, the show is about the previous Friday's collections. On Tuesday and Wednesday, Nahta speaks to various artists from the film industry. Thursdays preview films releasing on Friday. On Fridays, Nahta reviews films released on that day. The show launched the first episode with Sajid Nadiadwala as the guest. He was also the Editor of Entertainment website koimoi.com.

He runs a YouTube channel, 'Komal Nahata official' on which he give film reviews.

References

WEBSITE LINK
Komal Nahta

Indian magazine editors
Living people
Indian film critics
1964 births
Indian television talk show hosts